

Wakhan National Park is a national park in Afghanistan. Established in 2014, the park comprises the entire district of Wakhan, extending along the Wakhan Corridor between the Pamir mountains and the Hindu Kush, bordering Tajikistan to the north, Pakistan to the south, and China to the east. Flora and fauna include some 600 plant species, the snow leopard, lynx, wolf, brown bear, stone marten, red fox, Pallas's cat, ibex, Marco Polo sheep, and urial. Remote and largely above the tree line, poaching and overgrazing, rather than mining and logging, currently pose the main threats. 13,000 Wakhi and 1,500 Kyrgyz live in the area.

See also
 Band-e Amir National Park
 Wildlife of Afghanistan
 Wakhan
 Wakhan Corridor

References

External links
 National Natural Resource Management Strategy (2017-2021) (Ministry of Agriculture, Irrigation and Livestock)

National parks of Afghanistan
Wakhan
Protected areas established in 2014
2014 establishments in Afghanistan